Ham is a post-war suburb of Plymouth in the county of Devon, England. The population of the ward taken at the 2011 census was 13,294.

It is named after the 17th century Ham House, home of the Trelawney family. It is about 4 miles north of the present city centre and has suffered from its proximity to the once notoriously rough area called North Prospect. Close to the dockyard and naval Base as well as the A38 Plymouth Parkway the area has become convenient and desirable.

References

Suburbs of Plymouth, Devon